Rezső Patkoló, also known in Poland as Rudolf Patkolo (13 October 1922 – 1 September 1992) was a Hungarian-born footballer who played international football for both Hungary and Poland. He played as a striker for Gamma Budapest, Újpest, ŁKS Łódź, Polonia Bydgoszcz, Wisła Kraków, Stal Stalowa Wola and Kujawiak Włocławek.

References

1922 births
1992 deaths
Footballers from Budapest
Hungarian footballers
Hungary international footballers
Citizens of Poland through descent
Polish people of Hungarian descent
Hungarian people of Polish descent
Polish footballers
Poland international footballers
Dual internationalists (football)
Újpest FC players
ŁKS Łódź players
Wisła Kraków players
Stal Stalowa Wola players
Kujawiak Włocławek players
Association football forwards